Jordan Kawaguchi (born May 4, 1997) is a Canadian professional ice hockey centre currently playing with the Idaho Steelheads in the ECHL while under contract with the Texas Stars of the American Hockey League (AHL).

Early life
Kawaguchi was born on May 4, 1997, in Abbotsford, British Columbia to parents Todd and Brandy Kawaguchi. His father Todd was the only son of Japanese immigrant parents and he played college ice hockey at the University of British Columbia. He is the cousin of Devin Setoguchi, who played nine seasons in the National Hockey League.

Playing career
Growing up in British Columbia, Kawaguchi played for the Abbotsford Minor Hockey Association before joining the U15 Pursuit of Excellence prep program in Kelowna. While playing with the U15 prep team, he recorded 57 goals and 74 assists for 131 points in 43 games and was named Tournament MVP at the Kamloops International Ice Hockey Tournament. As a result, Kawaguchi was drafted in the fourth round, 80th overall, by the Spokane Chiefs in the Western Hockey League (WHL) Bantam Draft. However, he committed to play for the Chilliwack Chiefs in the British Columbia Hockey League (BCHL) for the 2012–13 season, where he recorded nine goals and nine assists as the team finished last in the Mainland Division. Kawaguchi spent four complete seasons with the Chiefs, where he increased his offensive output from his rookie season. He finished his BCHL career with 120 goals and 242 points in 213 career games while also earning BCHL All-Star honors.

Kawaguchi originally committed to play collegiate ice hockey with Providence College but changed to the University of North Dakota of the National Collegiate Hockey Conference.

After his junior season with the North Dakota Fighting Hawks, Kawaguchi was named to the AHCA First All-American Team.

Kawaguchi was named captain in his senior season with the Fighting Hawks, leading the team in scoring and placing fourth in the NCAA with 36 points through 28 games in the shortened 2020–21 season.

As an undrafted free agent, Kawaguchi turned professional in agreeing to a one-year, entry-level contract with the Dallas Stars on March 31, 2021. He was assigned by the Stars to join AHL affiliate, the Texas Stars.

On August 1, 2022, Kawaguchi as a free agent opted to remain within the Stars organization by signing a one-year AHL contract to continue with the Texas Stars for the 2022–23 season.

Career statistics

Awards and honors

References

External links
 

1997 births
Living people
AHCA Division I men's ice hockey All-Americans
Canadian ice hockey centres
Chilliwack Chiefs players
Ice hockey people from British Columbia
Idaho Steelheads (ECHL) players
North Dakota Fighting Hawks men's ice hockey players
Sportspeople from Abbotsford, British Columbia
Texas Stars players
West Kelowna Warriors players